The Suizhong Power Station, also known as Suizhong Power Plant, is a large coal-fired power station in Suizhong, China.

History
The first phase of the project of the Suizhong Power Station was started in 1993 and put into operation in 2000. 

The second phase of the project of the plant began construction on April 30, 2008, and began formal operation in 2010. After the second phase was completed and put into operation, the total installed capacity of Suizhong Power Station reached 3,600MW, making it the largest thermal power plant in Northeast China.

References 

2000 establishments in China
Energy infrastructure completed in 2000
Coal-fired power stations in China